The 16th Mumbai International Film Festival (Mumbai International Film Festival) was held from 28 January to 3 February 2020.

The list included various kind of Documentaries, short fiction and animation films. The festival also celebrated the birth centenary of Satyajit Ray by showcasing documentaries made by him including short film Pikoo (1980), Sukumar Ray (1987) and The Inner Eye (1972). In addition the festival showcased Satyajit Ray, Filmmaker (1982), directed by Shyam Benegal, and Sagnik Chatterjee’s documentary Feluda: 50 Years of Ray's Detective (2019), which focuses on Ray’s popular Feluda stories.

Jury 
The Jury panel for MIFF 2020 included:
 Shaji N Karun, Indian film director and cinematographer
 Robert Cahen, American university professor, theatre director, playwright, and drama critic
  Hama Haruka, Indian film producer
 Amrit Gangar, Indian film scholar, historian, critic, curator and writer
 Rehina Pareira, producer, writer
 Thomas Waugh, Canadian critic, lecturer, author, actor and activist
 A. K. Bir, Indian film cinematographer, screenwriter and director
 Utpal Borpujari, Indian National Film Award winner as a film critic, and as a filmmaker
 Pencho Kunchev, Bulgarian art director, director (Animation Department)
 Kireet Khurana, Indian filmmaker, storyteller, and ad-film director

Selection

International Competition

National Competition

International Prism

Masterclass 
16th edition of MIFF screened masterclasses by Michaël Dudok de Wit, Pencho Kunchev, Thomas Waugh, Mazhar Kamran, Ramesh Tekwani, Munjal Shroff, Chetan Sharma, etc.

Awards

National Competition
Best Animation Film :  MIXI (Jyotsna Puthran)

Best Short Fiction Film (up to 45mins.):  Bebaak: Dying wind in her hair  (Shazia Iqbal) ; Lacchavva (Jai Shankar) - Special Mention

Best Documentary film (below 60 minutes) : Atasi (Putul Mahmoodl) ; Son-Rise (Vibha Bakshi) - Special Mention

Best Documentary Film (above 60 minutes) : Sindhustan (Sapna Bhavnani)

Best Sound Design : Pariah Dog

Best Editing Film : The Saleswoman; Fiancees

Best Cinematography: Bebaak : Dying wind in her hair

Best Actor : Ritvik Sahore (To Remember Me By)

International Competition 
Best Animation Film : Portrait of Suzanne (Izabela Plucinska); The Fox of the Palmgrove (Divakar SK)

Best Short Fiction Film (up to 45 mins.) : An Essay of Rain (Nagraj Manjule)

Best Documentary Film of the Festival (Golden Conch) : Babenco: Tell Me When I Die (Barbara Paz)

Pramod Pati Special Jury Award (For Most Innovative / Experimental Film) (For Director only) : And What is the Summer Saying (Payal Kapadia), Echo From The Pukpui Skies (Joshy Joseph)

IDPA Award for Best Student Film : Naked Wall (Anant Dass Sahni)

Dadasaheb Phalke Chitranagari Award for Best Debut Film of a Director (Govt of Maharashtra) : Grandfather (Umashankar Nair)

Special Award for Best Short film on Water conservatio & Climate Change (up to 15 mins.)(For Indian filmmakers only) : The Wetland's Wail (Aravind M)

Lifetime Achievement Award
 
 Dr. V. Shantaram Lifetime Achievement Award: S. Krishnaswamy

References

External links

Indian film festivals
January 2020 events in India
February 2020 events in India